The two main labels that have been used to describe the nationality of Wolfgang Amadeus Mozart are "Austrian" and "German". However, in Mozart's own life, those terms were used differently from the way they are used today, because the modern nation states of Austria and Germany did not yet exist. Any decision to label Mozart as "Austrian" or "German" (or neither) involves political boundaries, history, language, culture, and Mozart's own views. Editors of modern encyclopedias and other reference sources differ in how they assign a nationality to Mozart (if any) in light of conflicting criteria.

Salzburg

Mozart was born in Salzburg, which was then the capital of the Prince-Archbishopric of Salzburg, a small, essentially sovereign state. Thus in one sense Mozart's nationality could be said to be "Salzburgian", though English-language biographers do not generally use this term to designate his nationality.

The Holy Roman Empire
The Archbishopric of Salzburg was but one of more than 300 similarly independent states in the part of Europe that was populated by German speakers. Most of these states, Salzburg included, were included in a larger political entity, the Holy Roman Empire. The Holy Roman Empire was German in various ways: most of its population was German-speaking, its official full name was the "Holy Roman Empire of the German Nation", it conducted most of its business in German, and one of the titles held by its emperor was "King in Germany." Derek Beales adds, "[the emperor] and the Empire were foci of German patriotism. Even in Hamburg, Protestant and remote from his court [in Vienna], prayers were regularly said for him and his birthday was celebrated."

However, although the Holy Roman Empire was largely German, it was hardly a nation state, but only a very loose confederation, the feeble residue of an empire that had been robust centuries earlier. According to the Encyclopædia Britannica, the princes whose states comprised the empire "legislated at will, levied taxes, concluded alliances, and waged wars against each other ... The imperial Diet meeting in Regensburg had degenerated into a debating society without authority or influence. The splendid [imperial] coronation ceremony in Frankfurt am Main could not disguise the fact that the office conferred on its holder little more than prestige."

Austria

The original Austria was the Archduchy of Austria, a rather small state centered around Vienna, roughly coextensive with the modern Austrian states of Upper Austria and Lower Austria. Starting in 1282 this core area was ruled by the Habsburg dynasty. Over the centuries, the Habsburgs accreted ever more lands to their holdings, both inside and outside the Holy Roman Empire, and both German and non-German speaking. Despite this expansion, the Habsburg dynasty retained an Austrian identity, maintaining their capital in Vienna and referring to their aggregated lands as "the Austrian Monarchy". The word "Austria" was sometimes used as an informal cover term for all of the lands ruled by the Habsburgs.
The power of the Habsburgs was such that they came to dominate the emperorship of the Holy Roman Empire: starting in 1452, the "Electors" (the handful of princes who held the right to elect the next emperor) virtually always chose the Habsburg monarch for the emperorship whenever the office became vacant. The emperors who served in Mozart's time were Francis I, Joseph II, and Leopold II. Of these, the latter two were Habsburg descendants; Francis I was the husband of the Habsburg ruler Maria Theresa, who held the emperorship on her behalf since as a woman she could not legally serve.

For administrative purposes, the Holy Roman Empire was divided into "circles". The Austrian Circle included the original Archduchy of Austria, as well as a number of other areas now part of modern Austria. Salzburg was not included; it was part of the Bavarian Circle.

In sum, "Austria" in Mozart's time could mean (in increasing order of size), the Archduchy of Austria, the Austrian Circle, and the Habsburg-ruled lands. None of these included Salzburg.

Although Mozart was not born in Austria (as then defined), he had close connections there. He made three extended visits to Vienna in his youth, and in 1781 moved to Vienna to pursue his career; he remained there to the end of his life (1791).

Maps
The map below portrays the Holy Roman Empire as of 1789, surrounded by a red dashed line. The Prince-Archbishopric of Salzburg, shaped somewhat like a thick inverted capital T, is shown in lavender in the southern portion of the map, sandwiched between the extensive Habsburg territories (shown in orange-brown ) and Bavaria (pale green ). The great number of small independent states that are now mostly part of Germany can also be seen. The extensive territories ruled by the Habsburgs but outside of the Holy Roman Empire are not indicated on the map.

For maps depicting the Circles of the Holy Roman Empire, see Imperial Circle.

Later developments
The political situation that prevailed in Mozart's lifetime did not long endure, with radical changes resulting from the Napoleonic Wars. Holy Roman Emperor Francis II first decreed (1804) a new Austrian Empire, consisting solely of the lands ruled directly by the Habsburgs. Two years later (1806), he allowed the Holy Roman Empire to lapse, ending its centuries-long existence.

The wars also had drastic consequences for Salzburg. In 1800 it was occupied by Napoleon's troops; the reigning prince-archbishop Hieronymus von Colloredo (Mozart's previous employer) had to flee. He never again exercised political rule, though he retained his ecclesiastical title. In the negotiated settlements that followed, Salzburg was first made into an independent secular state (the Electorate of Salzburg, 1803), then unified with the Austrian Empire (1805), then awarded to Bavaria (1809), and finally returned again to the Austrian Empire (1816).

The Austrian Empire underwent further political evolution, ultimately disintegrating in 1918 at the end of the First World War, at which time the small residual nation of Austria—including the old territory of Salzburg—was created.

"Germany" as cultural concept
As noted above, there was no country called "Germany" in Mozart's day; rather, there were hundreds of independent or quasi-independent German-speaking states. Of these, Prussia (blue on the map) was already on the rise, expanding its territory, and it was under Prussian leadership that Germany was ultimately unified in 1871. It was only as of that year that one could speak of a German nation-state.

However, the word "German" was in use well before this time, designating the people of central Europe who shared German language and culture. To give an example, when in 1801 Mozart's old colleague Emanuel Schikaneder opened the Theater an der Wien in Vienna, a Leipzig music journal praised the new theater as "the "most comfortable and satisfactory in the whole of Germany". The city of Salzburg, owing to its fine ecclesiastical architecture, was sometimes called "the German Rome".

Mozart himself used the word "German" in this sense, and apparently felt a sense of national or ethnic pride in being German. The following passage, from a letter to his father Leopold, attests to this:

A series of similar recorded utterances from Mozart is given by Kerst (1906). From this evidence, it is clear that Mozart considered himself to be German. However, for the reasons just given, the relevant sense is necessarily a linguistic or cultural one, there being no country of "Germany" of which Mozart could have been a citizen. Roselli (1998, 10) asserts that "Mozart was born into a part of Europe where nationality in the modern sense did not exist."

Summary
As can be seen, evidence is available to support a variety of opinions about Mozart's nationality. Thus, he was Austrian because the town in which he was born and raised is now in Austria, and because he made his career in Vienna, the Austrian capital. He was German because he felt himself to be German, and because the residual and moribund empire that included Salzburg was labeled as and felt to be German. He was neither Austrian nor German because Salzburg was independent, neither part of the Habsburg Austrian possessions nor part of a (yet to exist) German nation-state.

Scholarly practice
The scholars who prepare biographies and reference works have made varying choices in assigning Mozart a nationality.

The widely consulted Grove Dictionary of Music and Musicians calls Mozart an Austrian composer, as do the Houghton Mifflin Dictionary of Biography (2003), the Oxford Concise Dictionary of Music and the NPR Listener's Encyclopedia of Classical Music . The practice of the Encyclopædia Britannica is split: the brief anonymous summary ("Micropedia") article calls him Austrian, but the main article ("Macropedia"), written by H. C. Robbins Landon, makes no mention of a nationality.

Sources describing Mozart as German are more abundant in earlier work, particularly before the founding of the modern nation-state of Austria in 1918. A London newspaper, reporting the composer's death in 1791, referred to him as "the celebrated German composer". In , Mozart is introduced as "the great German composer";  included Mozart in a book called The Great German Composers.

Sources have sometimes changed their practice over time. The Grove dictionary did not always call Mozart "Austrian"; the designation appears to have been added with the first edition of the "New Grove" in 1980. Similarly, Baker's Biographical Dictionary of Musicians did not originally offer a nationality but added the word "Austrian" to its opening sentence for the 8th edition (1992) and has retained it since. The Encyclopædia Britannica, now an "Austrian" source, listed Mozart as a German composer in 1911.

Peter Branscombe's brief biography (2006, 304) begins with the description "composer and keyboard player"—in an encyclopedia that otherwise always specifies the nationality of composers, suggesting a deliberate omission of nationality. Other authors who say nothing about Mozart's nationality (whether deliberately or not) are Hermann Abert, Maynard Solomon, and Robbins Landon, mentioned above; and among encyclopedias the Riemann Musiklexikon (1961), and the International Cyclopedia of Music and Musicians (1985). The prestigious German music encyclopedia  lists no nationality, but this follows the policy it applies to all composers.

Julian Rushton, in his Mozart biography, summarizes many of the facts given above and concludes: "Mozart, by modern criteria Austrian, counted himself a German composer."

Notes

References

 Introduction by Cliff Eisen.

Further reading
Mersmann, Hans, ed. (1972) Letter of Wolfgang Amadeus Mozart. Dover Publications.
Rosselli, John (1998) The Life of Mozart. Cambridge: Cambridge University Press.

Nationality
History of nationality
Ethnicity